Caitlin O'Connor Purdy (born August 3, 1990), better known as Caitlin O'Connor, is an American actress, model and host.

Career
O'Connor was a cast member on the series finale of Two and a Half Men on CBS. She has also done a three-episode stint on Comedy Central's Tosh.0 as well as Key & Peele. In 2016, she starred in a national commercial for Dave & Busters Partnered with Bellator and also starred in the network commercial for GSN's "Baggage on the Road." She is best known as the host of ArsenicTV and for Maxim Magazine  She was also named one of the "Ten Hottest Girls in America" by Maxim in 2013. In 2014 O'Connor co-starred in national commercials for Budweiser Black Crown and PepsiNext. Her print campaign credits include Target, Macy's, Sons of Anarchy, Esquire, FHM, GQ, Nickelodeon's The Bratz, Xbox, and Pert Plus. She has been Sports Illustrated's 'Lady of the Day' seven times.  As a host, O'Connor has regular assignments on ArsenicTV, TorioTV, FOX News, The Chive, The Doctors on CBS, and Maria Menounos' AfterBuzz TV. She was a presenter at the World MMA Awards. O'Connor played lead female "Mirabelle" in the Machinima-produced web series "Tumbleweed." Caitlin is rated #8 in MODE Lifestyle Magazine's World's 100 Most Beautiful Women – 2016.

Personal life
O'Connor was born in Los Angeles and raised in Uniontown, Pennsylvania where she graduated high school. She moved back to Los Angeles at age 17 to attend UCLA as an English Major. She was UCLA's BruinBearWear catalog model and also worked her first job at Disneyland as a Disney princess/character actress. She is of Irish, English, and Hungarian descent. O'Connor loves combat sports and has worked as a ring girl for Top Rank Boxing, UFC Fight Pass' Invicta FC, GoldenBoy Boxing, BKB Boxing, and also was the lead ring girl in the 2015 feature film Southpaw.

Filmography, television roles, and appearances

References

External links

1990 births
Living people
American female models
American actresses
University of California, Los Angeles alumni
21st-century American women